Tintern (disambiguation) may refer to:
 Tintern, a village on the west bank of the River Wye in Monmouthshire, Wales
 Tintern (cheese), a Welsh cheese
 Tintern (civil parish, County Wexford), a civil parish in the barony of Shelburne, County Wexford, Ireland
 Tintern Grammar, a private school in Ringwood East, Victoria, Australia
 For articles related to Tintern Abbey see Tintern Abbey (disambiguation)